A Tribute to Judas Priest: Legends of Metal Vol. I and A Tribute to Judas Priest: Legends of Metal Vol. II are tribute albums, both released in 1997 by Century Media Records. It includes several rock and metal bands such as Helloween, Overkill, Saxon, Heavens Gate, Blind Guardian, Mercyful Fate, and Iced Earth, covering songs by British heavy metal band Judas Priest. Some of the songs included in this album have been previously released by the artists.

Track listing

Alternate releases

There are also a red-cover version (digipak) of Volume I and green-cover version (jewel case) of Volume II (subtitled "Delivering The Goods" instead of "Legends Of Metal"). Both CDs are released by the US branch of Century Media. The tracks are arranged across the two volumes in a different order, and the following tracks are not present:

"A Touch of Evil" (Lion's Share)
"The Sentinel" (Heaven's Gate)
"Dreamer Deceiver" (Skyclad)
"Night Comes Down" (Leviathan)

Two more tracks are nevertheless exclusive to these alternative releases, namely "Exciter" by Strapping Young Lad on Volume I and "Desert Plains" by Iron Savior on Volume II.

References

External links 
 Amazon.com: Tribute to Judas Priest: Legends of Metal: Various Artists: Music

1997 compilation albums
Judas Priest tribute albums
Heavy metal compilation albums